Nama densum (also, Nama densa) is a species of flowering plant in the borage family known by the common name leafy fiddleleaf, or leafy nama.

Distribution
It is native to the western United States from the Pacific Northwest to California to Colorado, where it grows in many types of mostly sandy or gravelly habitat.

Description
It is a very hairy annual plant forming a small patch of prostrate stems up to 10 centimeters long. It bears lance-shaped leaves up to 4 centimeters in length. The inflorescence is a tiny solitary flower blooming from a leaf axil. Each flower is white to purple-tinged, funnel-shaped, and just a few millimeters long.

External links
Jepson Manual Treatment
Montana Field Guide
Photo gallery

Hydrophylloideae
Flora of California
Flora of the West Coast of the United States
Flora of the Southwestern United States
Flora of the Northwestern United States
Flora of the Western United States
Flora without expected TNC conservation status